The Hamilton Heights Historic District is a national historic district in Hamilton Heights, New York, New York.  It consists of 192 contributing residential rowhouses, apartment buildings, and churches built between about 1886 and 1931.  Most are three and four story brick rowhouses set behind raised stone terraces. The three churches within the district are St. Luke's, the Convent Avenue Baptist Church, and St. James Presbyterian Church.  Architectural styles include Queen Anne, Romanesque, and Beaux-Arts.

It was listed on the National Register of Historic Places in 1983.

References

External links

Beaux-Arts architecture in New York City
Queen Anne architecture in New York City
Romanesque Revival architecture in New York City
Hamilton Heights, Manhattan
Historic districts on the National Register of Historic Places in Manhattan
Historic districts in Manhattan
New York City Designated Landmarks in Manhattan
New York City designated historic districts